11409 Horkheimer, provisional designation , is a Themistian asteroid from the outer regions of the asteroid belt, approximately  in diameter. It was discovered on 19 March 1999, by astronomers of the Lowell Observatory Near-Earth Object Search at Anderson Mesa Station near Flagstaff, Arizona. The likely C-type asteroid was named for American science communicator Jack Horkheimer.

Orbit and classification 

Horkheimer is a core member of the Themis family, a very large family of carbonaceous asteroids, named after 24 Themis. It orbits the Sun in the outer asteroid belt at a distance of 2.8–3.6 AU once every 5 years and 8 months (2,079 days; semi-major axis of 3.19 AU). Its orbit has an eccentricity of 0.12 and an inclination of 2° with respect to the ecliptic.

Physical characteristics 

Horkheimer has an absolute magnitude of 12.8. While its spectral type has not been determined, it is likely a carbonaceous C-type asteroid, typical for members of the Themis family. As of 2018, no rotational lightcurve has been obtained from photometric observations. The body's rotation period, pole and shape remain unknown.

Diameter and albedo 

According to the survey carried out by the NEOWISE mission of NASA's Wide-field Infrared Survey Explorer, Horkheimer measures 15.355 kilometers in diameter and its surface has an albedo of 0.053, typical for carbonaceous asteroids.

Naming 

This minor planet was named after Jack F. Horkheimer (1938–2010), director of the Planetarium at the former Miami Science Museum, who was the creator and host of the television program Jack Horkheimer: Star Gazer.
The official naming citation was published by the Minor Planet Center on 9 January 2001.

References

External links 
 
 Dictionary of Minor Planet Names, Google books
 Discovery Circumstances: Numbered Minor Planets (10001)-(15000) – Minor Planet Center
 
 

011409
011409
Named minor planets
19990319